is a fictional character from the Japanese multimedia franchise Digimon. He is a reptile-like Digimon who has appeared in various parts of the Digimon franchise including anime, manga, toys, video games, trading card games, and other media.

Creation and development
Agumon was created by Kenji Watanabe for the Digital Monster Virtual Pet in 1997 and was created to be a dinosaur that would be able to be taken on a stroll.

Anime
While creating the Digimon Adventure short, director Mamoru Hosoda wanted to focus on Tai and Kari's relationship with Koromon, the Digimon that appeared in their house. The main theme of the movie was how Tai and Kari had problems interacting with the Digimon as across its multiple forms, he is either silent or talkative. Due to time constraints, Hosoda claimed that the friendship presented was one-dimensional.

Hosoda further elaborated on the bond between Agumon and Tai as they are allies despite being from different ways and expressed a challenge about how it was possible that Tai could help his partner during the battles. As a result, he felt the friendship between Agumon and Tai be deeper based on the latter's dilemma. He wants to make Digimon give complete confidence to the humans and thus wanted to give an scenario in for the second OVA to how Tai could help Agumon become stronger and defeat the villain, Diaboromon. That's the part I want to let “miracles” take care of. Not to resolve the plot conveniently, but to overcome real issues like this. Taichi and their friends don’t need to help their partner in the Digital World, but just be by their side. Hosoda wanted people to understand that is the important thing. "On the first glance, it looks like they triggered a “miracle” at that moment, but what they really overcame was that psychological limit". Through this film, Hosoda wanted to make sure Agumon was not a pet and instead a friend to Tai.

In regards to the series' reboot, director Masato Mitsuka claimed that their "important task is to make sure things come across to the viewer as cool". He says he found it difficult to think about how to show "cool" action sequences using the physics of the Digimon and especially Greymon, compared to Son Goku from Dragon Ball Super and his panoply of attacks. "The Digimon will reach Ultimate-level very quickly, so in the long run, the time Agumon will actively spend as an Adult-level Greymon will be gone... [...] Still, we were very enthusiastic about wanting to show off the pride of an Adult-level."; "Ultimate-level Omegamon is one of the most impressive "symbols" of Digimon, still to this day, with many derivatives [...] its appearance and the when and how were determined even before I was brought into the project. [...] Special circumstances have made it so that there aren't many occasions with a proper action-like depiction of Omegamon, he's always been protected for very particular moments. But I wanted to depict him as the miracle that appears after overcoming great difficulties. May each of his appearances in this new TV series be a chance to make him fight powerful enemies, while displaying his strength and a status of crisis saviour." explains Masato Mitsuka.

In Japanese, Agumon is voiced by Chika Sakamoto. In English the role is taken by and Tom Fahn (Agumon) MJ Lallo/Philece Sampler/Brianne Siddall did Koromon while Doug Erholtz voiced SkullGreymon. Michael Lindsay/Kyle Hebert voiced Greymon, and Joseph Pilato/Kyle Hebert voiced MetalGreymon, and Lex Lang/Kyle Hebert voiced WarGreymon. In the Adventure movie, Peggy O'Neal voiced Botamon, Michael Sorich Agumon - Adventure Movie, and Bob Papenbrook Greymon.

Taiki Matsuno and Brian Beacock voice the 2006 version of Agumon in Digimon Data Squad.

Appearances

Virtual pets
Agumon debuted in the Digital Monster Ver.1 on June 26, 1997. It has since appeared in most Digimon virtual pet releases, in which Agumon has achieved hundreds of different digivolutions.

Video games
Agumon appears in almost every single Digimon video game, though a few of its appearances only feature the 2006 re-design from Digimon Data Squad rather than the original 1997 design. Across the video games Agumon has achieved hundreds of different digivolutions.

Anime

Digimon Adventure media
Agumon first appeared in the original video animation (OVA) Digimon as a recently born Digimon who befriends the toddlers Tai Kamiya and Kari Kamiya. As it bonds with them, it evolves. When a giant Digimon known as Parrotmon invades the city, the two engage in fight. Agumon is nearly defeated but regains consciousness when Tai plays the whistle. Shortly afterwards, Agumon disappears alongside his enemy.

Agumon later appears in the anime Digimon Adventure as Tai's partner Digimon when the human finds himself lost in the Digital World. He is simple-minded, but he always believes Tai has the best interests for the team and trusts him as a friend. Tai finds an item known as Crest of Courage, he forces Greymon to reach a new evolution form  but it becomes berserk and attacks all his allies. When becoming tired, SkullGreymon returns to his Koromon form and Tai requests forgiveness for acting so reckless. Agumon reaches his appropriate Ultimate form, when Tai unawarely shows bravery to save Sora and defeat Etemon. The fight results in Tai and Koromon finding themselves in the human world where Kari confuses him for the other Koromon from the OVA. Tai and Koromon eventually return to the Digital World to aid their friends. During the battle against the stronger VenomMyotismon, Tai and Agumon are given new powers thanks to Angewomon's arrow allowing the Digimon to take the Mega Digimon. . After saving the Digital World from the Dark Masters and Apocalymon, Agumon says Tai farewell as the latter returns to the human world. 

In the OVA Our War Game, Agumon travels the web alongside Tentomon, Patamon and Gabumon to defeat Diaboromon, who hacks The Pentagon to launch an LGM-118 Peacekeeper missile at Tokyo. WarGreymon and MetalGarurumon are beaten up by Diaboromon but when Tai and Matt enter the internet and received mails encouraging them to win, the two Mega Digimon combine to become the warrior  and kill Diaboromon. 

In Digimon Adventure 02 Agumon is kidnapped by Ken Ichijoji who forces him to evolve into SkullGreymon and later  as his puppet. He is saved by Garurumon and Raildramon as they destroy the item that made Ken control him. 

Agumon also has access to an alternate Mega form called , a Digivolution forged by the bond between Agumon and Tai. In the reboot series, Agumon gains a corrupted form in a partially formed  and an alternate Mega form called BlitzGreymon.

In the 2020 Digimon Adventure reboot, Agumon is one of six legendary Digimon that fought and destroyed Millenniummon in the ancient past, dying in the process and being reborn. Like in the original series, he is partnered with Tai Kamiya and along with his original digivolutions, he can become MetalGreymon Alterous Mode, a Mode Change of his Ultimate form MetalGreymon that has an arm cannon, a corrupted Mega form in a partially formed  and an alternate Mega form called BlitzGreymon caused by an adaptive digivolution. Agumon often acts as the powerhouse of the team, particularly after he digivolves to Mega, becoming the most often appearing Mega Digimon. As WarGreymon, he destroys ZeedMillenniummon once and for all when he's resurrected, using a Terra Force powered by the hopes of all of the Digimon that the DigiDestined have met along the way and the power of Goddramon and Holydramon. Agumon has a strong bond with Tai, able to pick his real partner out amongst a number of Algomon replicas when he is put to the test. In the series finale, Agumon gains a digivolution, becoming Omegamon Alter-S to destroy Abbadomon. At the end of the series, rather than returning to the Real World like the other Chosen Ones and their partners, Taichi chooses to stay in the Digital World with Agumon and continue their adventures together.

Digimon Data Squad
Agumon was re-designed for Digimon Data Squad, with this version of Agumon considered a different species under the name .

Other anime
Agumon cameos in the rest of the Digimon anime, with both Tai's Agumon and Marcus' Agumon appearing in Digimon Fusion as part of a cross-over.

Manga
Agumon appears in the first ever Digimon Manga C'mon Digimon with a different design than what was used in other media, having been redesigned by Tenya Yabuno. This design was never used again. Agumon also appears in Digimon Next as the partner of Tsurugi Tatsuno. Tai's Agumon's appears during a cross-over in the Digimon Fusion manga and Digimon Adventure V-Tamer 01, with Tai's Agumon meeting his alternate universe counterparts. Finally, various Agumon cameo in the rest of Digimon's Mangas.

Manhua
Tai's Agumon appears in the various Manhua made by Yuen Wong Yu.

Trading cards
Agumon has appeared on a large amount of cards in the various Digimon trading card games. Across the trading cards Agumon has achieved hundreds of different digivolutions.

Live action
Agumon appears as the protagonist in the 2020 live action short Welcome to Digimon World. It appears as Pulsemon's rival in the 2021 live action shorts Digimon Project 2021.

Film
Agumon made a cameo appearance alongside game characters from various games in the 2015 film, Pixels.

Reception
UK Anime Network felt that Agumon was the franchise' mascot as an answer to Pikachu from Pokémon and felt the former was more appealing due to his continuous evolutions fight scenes in the 1990s. IGN Agumon's relationship with Tai which made one of the most popular characters from the '90s. In a poll he was voted as the 5th "Which catcher/trainer would take home the gold?" IGN listed how Tai forces Agumon to evolve into SkullGreymon as one of the best moments from the first Digimon anime. Additionally, Tai and Koromon's brief return to the real world as listed as another moment due to Tai's brief interactions with his younger sister, Kari. Crunchyroll agreed, finding this episode showed Tai's flaws for the first time in the anime and how it resulted in SkullGreymon's evolution. DVD Talk saw Agumon as a fanfavorite character, being the cause to why Toei reused another incarnation of the character as a protagonist in Digimon Data Squad. The evolution of Omegamon in Tri was noted to be an entertaining idea Toei used in the first film of the series but felt the execution was poorly handled. The Fandom Post felt that Agumon's inability to console Tai in Tri when wondering about the dangers the fights can cause is well written with visuals helping to create a good scene. However, the writer felt that Omegamon's fight against Alphamon was anticlimactic as the writing was instead more focused on Tai's concerns.

Critics also commented on Agumon's role in Last Evolution Kizuna. IGN praised how Augmon visited Tai's home in the film, giving it a more mature feeling as appealing as fight sequences. HobbyConsolas praised the dilemma presented in the movie as the more Agumon and Gabumon fight, the less time they have to interact with their friends, giving a major emotional impact in the narrative. Anime News Network criticized how the film primarily focused on Agumon and Gabumon's relationships with their partners as the rest of the cast do not carry such importance. Inside Pulse felt the emotional value was presented in the film not only due to the fact Agumon will never be with Tai again but also because it has been nearly twenty years since the first series' premiere and the story concludes the events of the original series' canon. Joshua Seth and Tom Fahn reflect on what might be their final vocal sessions as Tai and Agumon. Little did either of them know that a job two decades ago would last so long.

For the original series' reboot, Polygon criticized the heavy focus on Agumon and Gabumon's evolutions and fights as, sometimes, the rest of the cast members feel too minor. Anime News Network's writers were divided about the handling of Agumon in the premiere as while his design remains appealing, his early evolution into Greymon lacks a reason to explain how he has such powers. Christopher Farris from the same site praised how Agumon was supported by Tai to become Greymon and how it later merges with Garurumon to create an enjoyable fight sequence as the warrior Omegamon. Chruncyroll described the reboot's Agumon as more likable than the original due to his constant fights he is involved rather than the original childish Agumon. Comic Book Resources claimed fans were divided in regards to the handling of the main cast in the premiere as Greymon and Garurumon combine into Omegamon despite lacking the strength the original canon needed in order to reach this form. When the reboot introduced DoneDevimon as a villain, Anime News Network praised MetalGreymon's "Dark Evolution" into Mugendramon due to the chaotic scenario presented as the character became enraged when Tai was eaten by the villain. When Mugendramon's evolution is reversed as Agumon regains his senses and instead becomes the original Final Form WarGreymon was praised for the visuals and other elements that helped to make the episode one of the best in the series. The Fandom Post compared this episode to the original canon to when Agumon became the berserker SkullGreymon but believed the reboot was done in a better fashion. However, he still felt that the evolution as lackluster. Once Agumon becomes WarGreymon again, the same site called it "was the saving grace of this episode" based on how the evolution was handled and claimed that it was important as he considered Agumon the franchise's mascot, thus needing an appealing evolution sequence.

References

Digimon
Video game characters introduced in 1997
Video game mascots
Animated television characters
Television characters introduced in 1999
Animated characters introduced in 1999
Anthropomorphic dinosaurs
Dragon characters in video games
Shapeshifter characters in video games
Video game characters with fire or heat abilities